Tipperary competed in the 1999 National Hurling League and the 1999 Munster Championship. It was Nicky English's first year in charge of the team with Tommy Dunne also in his first year as team captain. Finches continued as sponsors of Tipperary GAA. 

On 2 May, Tipperary won the league title following a 1-14 - 1-10 win over Galway in the final. It was their first league title since 1993-94 and their 17th National League title overall.

On 12 June, Tipperary lost to Clare in the Munster semi-final replay by 1-21 to 1-11 and failed to qualify for the All-Ireland Championship.

1999 National Hurling League

Group 1B table

1999 Munster Senior Hurling Championship

Awards
Tommy Dunne won Tipperary's only All Star Award.

References

External links
Tipperary GAA Archives 1999
Photographs from the 1999 League Final
1999 Teams and Results at Premierview
Clare V Tipperary 6 June 1999 on YouTube
Clare V Tipperary 12 June 1999 on YouTube

Tipp
Tipperary county hurling team seasons